Boris Khodorov (b. 17 January 1922 – d. 5 July 2014) was a Soviet and Russian physiologist, M.D., D.Sc., Professor of Physiology, and Head of the Cell Physiology section of Moscow Physiological Society (formerly the Pavlov All-USSR Society of Physiologists).

Biography 

Boris Israelevitch Khodorov was born in Kerch, on 17 January 1922. In 1946, Khodorov was dismissed from the Red Army and started his scientific career in Moscow as a research assistant at the V.I. Lenin Moscow State Pedagogical University (1946-1953). There he received his PhD in Biology (1949). He moved again to the Institute of General Pathology and Pathophysiology as a Senior Research Scientist (1988-2014). There in 2001 he founded the Laboratory of Ion Transport Pathology and Intracellular Signaling.

Scientific Contributions

Khodorov published over 175 research papers and books, mostly concerning ion channels and membrane electrical excitability. He trained many successful scientists who hold faculty positions in universities all over the world.  Initially at the V.I. Lenin Moscow State Pedagogical University, like other Soviet neurobiologists he was required to work on Pavlovian conditioning. After Soviet science was liberalized in the 1960s, he moved to ion channels, developing as a leader in the actions of local anesthetics and toxins on membrane excitability and building up one of the three principal centers of ion channel research in the Soviet Union. At the Vishnevsky Institute of Surgery, the Khodorov laboratory carried out pioneering studies in the field of ion channel biophysics, recording electrical activities from the nodes of Ranvier, studying the mechanisms of C-type inactivation in voltage-gated ion channels and the effects of neurotoxins and local anesthetics on membrane excitability. Subsequently, at the Institute of General Pathology and Pathophysiology[3], he studied structure and function of the NMDA-subtype of ionotropic glutamate receptors, focusing on the mechanisms of gating and ion channel block. At the same time, in collaboration with the laboratories of Dr. Pinelis at the Institute of Pediatrics (Moscow, Russia) and Dr. Duchen at the University College London, Khodorov was studying calcium homeostasis, glutamate excitotoxicity and mitochondrial dysfunction in neurons. He was a member of a number of editorial boards including that of the journal Membrane and Cell Biology.

Personal life

He was married in 1949 to Faina Sheykhon, physiologist, and they had one child Alla born in 1954.

In 1985 Boris Khodorov was awarded the USSR State Prize.

Publications 
 
 
  First published in Russian as «Физиология человека»

References

External links
 Ходоров, Борис Израилевич — an article in the Great Encyclopedia of Biographies
 Boris Khodorov’s profile at the VIP-persons website 

1922 births
2014 deaths
People from Kerch
Russian Jews
Soviet Jews
Russian physiologists
Russian neuroscientists
Jewish scientists
Soviet physiologists
20th-century Russian scientists
21st-century Russian scientists
Soviet military personnel of World War II
Recipients of the USSR State Prize
Soviet military doctors